Kobie Watkins (born July 26, 1975) is an American drummer and percussionist in Jazz, Latin, and Gospel music genres, and a music educator.

Biography
Kobie Watkins was born July 26, 1975 in Chicago.  He began as a small child listening and watching his father, Alious C. Watkins,  who was a drummer for their church.

Watkins studied percussion at Vandercook College of Music with vibraphonist Marc Max Jacoby and percussionist Kevin Lepper at school by day. By night, Watkins spent time playing jazz with alto saxophonist Dennis Winslett, performing in the pit at local theaters and performed for cabaret shows.  He earned his bachelor's degree in music education from Vandercook in 1999.  He received his Master of Music from Northwestern University in jazz pedagogy in 2003.

He became a public school band director.  At night, he played gigs around the Chicago area and throughout the United States. Watkins developed the nickname the Swing Master of Chicago. He was depicted in a front-page article in the Joliet, Illinois’- Herald, -a local newspaper titled, "Teacher has Alter Ego as Jazz Musician."

Honors
 Walt Disney World American All-Star Band,  Magic Kingdom (Orlando, FL) - 1998

Side man
Watkins has played in groups on stage and in recordings for:
 Sonny Rollins
 Kurt Elling
 Curtis Fuller
 Arturo Sandoval
 George Coleman
 Ira Sullivan
 Sonny Fortune
 Fred Anderson
 Ari Brown
 Willie Pickens
 Bobby Broom
 The Bobby Broom Trio
 The Bobby Broom Organi-Sation
 Orbert Davis
 Ken Chaney
 Ron Perrillo
 Bethany Pickens
 Ryan Cohan
 Dennis Winslett
 Jarrard Harris
 James Austin
 Kim Burrell
 Julie Dexter
 Javier
 Kendra Ross
 Chris Robinson
 Dom Flemons

Kobie has toured extensively in Africa, Europe, Asia, Canada, South America and the United States.

As music educator
Watkins worked with Wynton Marsalis at Martin Luther King High School in Chicago, IL. at a clinic for high school students learning Jazz. He worked with the Ravinia mentors program of the Chicago Public High School system, as well as "Attention for Boys" a MusicAlive mentoring and teaching program that was started by Orbert Davis and Mark Ingram for inner-city youth ages 8 to 18 years.

Since 2004, Watkins led a teen band in worship at a Christian Teen Camp in Lake Geneva, Wisconsin. He works with the Triangle Youth Jazz Ensembles in North Carolina.

Recordings

As leader
 Involved (2006) – Origin 82532

As sideman
 In Circles – The Spin Quartet (Origin 82676)
 Upper West Side Story – Bobby Broom (Origin 82617)
 Bobby Broom Plays for Monk – Bobby Broom (Origin 82534)
 The Way I Play: Live In Chicago – Bobby Broom (Origin 82504)
 Song And Dance – Bobby Broom (Origin 82475)

References

1975 births
Living people
American jazz drummers
The Bobby Broom Organi-Sation members